Otto Jettman, better known by his stage name Otto Knows (born 6 May 1989) is a Swedish DJ, record producer and remixer who has had a number of hits in Sweden, Belgium and the Netherlands and has collaborated with artists including Britney Spears, Avicii, Sebastian Ingrosso, Alesso and has made remixes for ATB, Imogen Heap, Lindsey Stirling and others. He is best known for his songs like "Starlight (Otto Knows Remix)", "Parachute", "Next to Me", "Dying for You" and "Million Voices".

Jettman met Sebastian Ingrosso in Stockholm and soon after joined Ingrosso's Refune, touring alongside Ingrosso as a DJ and producer. Jettman also collaborated with Tim Bergling, also known as Avicii and Oliver Ingrosso on the song "iTrack". He followed this up with "Million Voices", created in the back room of the studio whilst Ingrosso and Alesso penned the popular festival song "Calling". "Million Voices" was later added to the A playlist at BBC Radio 1. It later charted in the top 15 of the UK Singles Chart and achieved gold in Australia, Ireland, the Netherlands, Sweden and platinum in Belgium.

Music career

2010–13: Breakthrough
His break came in 2010 on the electronic scene with a remix of "Hide and Seek" by Imogen Heap. This caught the attention of Tim Bergling that used his production in "Hide & Seek (Avicii Remix)". He has had a number of chart successes including his single "iTrack" credited to Tim Berg vs Oliver Ingrosso & Otto Knows and with his remix of Dada Life's "Kick Out the Epic Motherf**ker". His biggest hit is his 2012 European single "Million Voices" that has reached number three on the Ultratop 50, the Belgian Singles Chart and number six on the Dutch Singles Chart. It has also charted within the top 15 of the UK Singles Chart. In late 2012, Otto remixed "Lies" by British DJ/record producer Burns, which was included in the extended play release of the single in the UK. The remix proved to fair commercially better and peaked at number 32 in the UK Singles Chart on 24 December 2012 after four weeks. In 2013, he co-wrote and co-produced "Work Bitch" by Britney Spears.

2014–present
In June 2014 Otto's follow‐up single "Parachute" was released. It was premiered by Danny Howard on his BBC1 radio show. In September 2014 Otto Knows also released a rework of Bebe Rexha's "I Can't Stop Drinking About You". The track was premiered by Otto at Bråvalla Festival in June and was played throughout the summer at Ushuaïa in Ibiza.
In October 2014, four remixes of "Parachute" were released by Bottai, Drumsound & Bassline Smith, CamelPhat and Zastenker. In May 2015 Otto released the single "Next to Me".

In 2016 Otto released the single "Dying for You" featuring Lindsey Stirling and Alex Aris. The lyric video for the song was released on YouTube on 14 January 2016, with the official video following on 1 February.

Discography

Singles

Remixes

References

External links
 

Swedish DJs
Living people
Swedish house musicians
1989 births
Progressive house musicians
Electronic dance music DJs